1888 Studios is a proposed film and television studio planned to be built on a  site at Bergen Point in Bayonne, New Jersey. Its name is a nod to the year the movie camera was invented.

The waterfront brownfield site on the Kill van Kull and Newark Bay was a former Texaco site rezoned in 2020 in a redevelopment plan to permit a film studio to be built. When completed, it will be New Jersey's largest film and television studio and will include a part of the Hackensack RiverWalk.

The project, which will include approximately 19 buildings, is estimated to cost $700 million in construction and $200 million in land development. The City of Bayonne floated a bond of $65 million to support the project. as well a PILOT agreement.

The design is by Gensler. Construction is expected to start in 2023.

See also
Television and film in New Jersey

References

Buildings and structures in Bayonne, New Jersey
Mass media in Hudson County, New Jersey